Agave stricta, the hedgehog agave, is a species of flowering plant in the family Asparagaceae, native to Puebla and Oaxaca in Southern Mexico. The foliage may develop a red tinge in the summer. The plant is also known to produce pincushion-like offsets as it grows.

The Latin specific epithet stricta means erect, or upright.

It has gained the Royal Horticultural Society's Award of Garden Merit. As with most succulents, it prefers full sun and well drained soils, and may develop root rot if overwatered.

References

stricta
Flora of Puebla
Flora of Oaxaca
Plants described in 1859